The 1971 United States Grand Prix was a Formula One motor race held on October 3, 1971, at the Watkins Glen Grand Prix Race Course in Watkins Glen, New York. It was race 11 of 11 in both the 1971 World Championship of Drivers and the 1971 International Cup for Formula One Manufacturers. The 59-lap race was won by Tyrrell driver François Cevert after he started from fifth position. Jo Siffert finished second for the BRM team and March driver Ronnie Peterson came in third.

Summary
Jackie Stewart's domination in 1971 clinched his second Driver's Championship with three races remaining, but the final round belonged to his Tyrrell teammate, François Cevert. The Frenchman took the lead from Stewart on lap 14 and went on to claim his only career win, the first GP victory for a French driver since Maurice Trintignant in 1958.

As usual, the American race attracted a large field of entrants, despite it being the last race of the year and both Championships having long been wrapped up. It seemed nearly every spare works F1 car and quite a few independents, as well, were present to try for a share of the $267,000 in prize money, easily the richest purse in F1. Unfortunately, the two most popular American drivers, Mario Andretti and Mark Donohue, who was fresh from a stunning third place finish in Canada in his Formula One debut, were committed to drive on Sunday in a USAC race which had incomprehensibly been rescheduled to the GP weekend after a previous rainout. The two drivers qualified, Andretti in a Ferrari and Donohue in a McLaren shared with David Hobbs, hoping for more rain in New Jersey and the chance to return for the race on Sunday.Since the previous year's race, the course had been resurfaced, widened and, most significantly, lengthened by a mile to 3.377 miles with an entirely new section at the southwest corner called the "Boot" or "Anvil". The pits were also moved from the north end straight back before the right angle turn known as "The 90," which now became Turn One.

Friday was sunny and hot, and Stewart jumped immediately to the top of the charts with a time of 1:42.844, as the times were recorded to a thousandth of a second for the first time. On Saturday, with the temperature now 110° and both Goodyear's and Firestone's qualifying tires breaking down after a few laps, Emerson Fittipaldi pipped Stewart's time from the day before, but the Scot returned to the track and grabbed the pole by .017 of a second. Denny Hulme joined them on the front row in his McLaren, followed by Clay Regazzoni's Ferrari, Cevert and the soon-to-be-absent Andretti. American Peter Revson qualified nineteenth in the third Tyrrell. It was his only race for Tyrrell and his first Grand Prix since 1964.

Race
Sunday was dry in both upstate New York and Trenton, New Jersey, and word came that the USAC race would go on, dismaying both the crowd and the organizers, who were robbed of seeing two of the country's best road racers. At the start, Denny Hulme jumped into the lead, ahead of Cevert and Stewart, but by the end of the first lap, Stewart led Hulme, Cevert, Regazzoni, Jo Siffert, Jacky Ickx, Chris Amon and Fittipaldi.

At first, Stewart was able to open a gap back to the following group, now headed by his teammate, but after ten laps, his tires began to go off and the gap closed. The Scot realized that Cevert's Goodyears were holding up much better in the heat, and when Cevert closed up right behind him, he waved him by on lap 14. Hulme was now struggling with a terrible vibration in his tires and was passed, first by Ickx, then Regazzoni and Siffert. On lap 15, American Sam Posey, in his first Grand Prix, retired from a fine run with a blown piston in his Surtees. By the time Ickx could get around Stewart on lap 17, Cevert's lead was 5.7 seconds.

At about half-distance, Cevert finally began to struggle with the same understeer that had plagued Stewart much earlier. Ickx was closing, and his Firestones were getting better as the race went on. On lap 43, the Belgian set the fastest lap of the race, and the gap was down to 2.2 seconds. Then, on lap 49, the Ferrari's alternator fell off, punching a hole in the gearbox and spilling oil all over the track! Hulme hit the oil and spun into the barrier, bending his front suspension. He was standing beside the track when Cevert came by and also hit the barrier, but kept going, now 29 seconds in the lead!

Jo Siffert was now in second place and 33 seconds clear of Ronnie Peterson. With four laps to go, however, Siffert began to run low on fuel. The Swede took huge chunks off the gap as Siffert jerked the BRM from side to side, trying to use every remaining drop of fuel. Cevert coasted home, taking both hands off the wheel to wave as he crossed the line, and Siffert weaved his way around to hold second place by four seconds over Peterson's March.

After taking the checkered flag, Cevert gave a nod to his teammate. "I feel pretty good with a $50,000 win. I followed Stewart in the beginning and was flagged on ahead. Jackie Stewart is a very sensible driver and a very good teacher. He let me go through." While it was the first race on the expanded Watkins Glen track, it was the third year in a row that The Glen had rewarded a driver with his first career victory. This was Cevert’s only victory in Formula One.

 Qualifying 

 Qualifying classification 

 Race 

 Classification 

Championship standings after the race

Drivers' Championship standings

Constructors' Championship standings

Note: Only the top five positions are included for both sets of standings. Only the best 5 results from the first 6 rounds and the best 4 results from the last 5 rounds counted towards the Championship. Numbers without parentheses are Championship points; numbers in parentheses are total points scored.

References

Further reading
 Doug Nye (1978). The United States Grand Prix and Grand Prize Races, 1908-1977. B. T. Batsford. 
 Rob Walker (January 1972). "13th U.S. Grand Prix: A First For Number Two". Road & Track'', 39-43.

United States Grand Prix
United States Grand Prix
United States Grand Prix
United States Grand Prix
United States Grand Prix